Kirill Viktorovich Pogrebnyak (born 27 June 1992) is a Russian former football second striker.

Career
Pogrebnyak made his professional debut for Tom Tomsk on 17 July 2011 in the Russian Cup game against Metallurg-Oskol.

He scored his first goal for the club against Sibir Novosibirsk on 1 September 2012. It was Pogrebnyak's equaliser that led Tom Tomsk to the penalty shootout where they won 4-3.

On 3 August 2013, Pogrebnyak was moved to FC Fakel Voronezh.

On 12 March 2019, he signed a one-year contract with Allsvenskan club Falkenbergs.

Personal life
He is the younger brother of Pavel Pogrebnyak and twin of Nikolai Pogrebnyak.

References

External links
  Player page on the official FC Tom Tomsk website
 
 

1992 births
Twin sportspeople
Footballers from Moscow
Living people
Russian footballers
Russia youth international footballers
Association football forwards
FC Tom Tomsk players
FC Fakel Voronezh players
FC Zenit-2 Saint Petersburg players
FC Baltika Kaliningrad players
Falkenbergs FF players
Russian Premier League players
Allsvenskan players
Russian expatriate footballers
Expatriate footballers in Sweden
Russian expatriate sportspeople in Sweden
Expatriate footballers in Uzbekistan
Russian expatriate sportspeople in Uzbekistan